Carbona is an unincorporated community in San Joaquin County, California, United States. Carbona's post office is Tracy but has its own ZIP code 95304.

History
Carbona was originally a railroad station built at the junction with the Alameda and San Joaquin Railroad spur line to the Tesla coal mines in Corral Hollow.  The spur line was closed in 1916, by the Western Pacific Railroad following a flood in 1911 when the railroad line, coal other facilities were destroyed and the towns of Carnegie and Tesla were abandoned.

References

Unincorporated communities in California
Unincorporated communities in San Joaquin County, California